Channel Lake is an unincorporated community and census-designated place (CDP) in Antioch Township, Lake County, Illinois, United States. Per the 2020 census, the population was 1,581.

Geography
It is bordered to the east by the community of Lake Catherine and to the north by the village of Salem Lakes, Wisconsin.

Demographics

2020 census

Note: the US Census treats Hispanic/Latino as an ethnic category. This table excludes Latinos from the racial categories and assigns them to a separate category. Hispanics/Latinos can be of any race.

2000 Census
As of the census of 2000, there were 1,785 people, 696 households, and 473 families residing in the CDP. The racial makeup of the CDP was 96.13% White, 0.22% African American, 0.90% Native American, 0.73% Asian, 1.18% from other races, and 0.84% from two or more races. Hispanic or Latino of any race were 1.85% of the population.

There were 696 households, out of which 32.5% had children under the age of 18 living with them, 52.4% were married couples living together, 8.9% had a female householder with no husband present, and 31.9% were non-families. 24.4% of all households were made up of individuals, and 7.0% had someone living alone who was 65 years of age or older. The average household size was 2.56 and the average family size was 3.06.

In the CDP, the population was spread out, with 25.2% under the age of 18, 6.9% from 18 to 24, 31.8% from 25 to 44, 25.4% from 45 to 64, and 10.7% who were 65 years of age or older. The median age was 38 years. For every 100 females, there were 112.2 males. For every 100 females age 18 and over, there were 112.2 males.

The median income for a household in the CDP was $51,384, and the median income for a family was $62,917. Males had a median income of $39,107 versus $30,050 for females. The per capita income for the CDP was $27,772. About 7.6% of families and 9.9% of the population were below the poverty line, including 19.6% of those under age 18 and 4.8% of those age 65 or over.

References

Census-designated places in Illinois
Unincorporated communities in Illinois
Census-designated places in Lake County, Illinois